The Miami Caliente was a women's American football team in the Lingerie Football League based in the Miami area. They were part of the Lingerie Bowl's expansion into a full-fledged league in 2009 with home games at the BankAtlantic Center in Sunrise, Florida. Head coach Bob Hewko was a quarterback for the University of Florida and a back-up quarterback for the Tampa Bay Buccaneers.

On November 13, 2009, Taira Turley and Tina Caccavale were ejected from a game for fighting when a multiple-player brawl, instigated by Morgan McGrath, erupted near the end of the game against the New York Majesty.  Krystal Gray of the Majesty was also ejected and suspended for one game.

The Caliente reached the 2009–10 Eastern Conference championship game on February 4, 2010, at the Seminole Hard Rock Hotel and Casino in Hollywood, Florida, but lost 20–7 to the Chicago Bliss.

The Caliente played one more season, moving outdoors to FIU Stadium, before ceasing operations in 2011.

Roster

References

Legends Football League US teams
American football teams in Florida
Caliente
American football teams established in 2009
2009 establishments in Florida
Women's sports in Florida